In number theory, a branch of mathematics, a highly cototient number is a positive integer  which is above 1 and has more solutions to the equation 

than any other integer below  and above 1. Here,  is Euler's totient function. There are infinitely many solutions to the equation for 

 = 1 

so this value is excluded in the definition. The first few highly cototient numbers are:

2, 4, 8, 23, 35, 47, 59, 63, 83, 89, 113, 119, 167, 209, 269, 299, 329, 389, 419, 509, 629, 659, 779, 839, 1049, 1169, 1259, 1469, 1649, 1679, 1889, ... 

Many of the highly cototient numbers are odd. In fact, after 8, all the numbers listed above are odd, and after 167 all the numbers listed above are congruent to 29 modulo 30.

The concept is somewhat analogous to that of highly composite numbers. Just as there are infinitely many highly composite numbers, there are also infinitely many highly cototient numbers. Computations become harder, since integer factorization becomes harder as the numbers get larger.

Example
For example, the cototient of 6 is 4 since these four positive integers have a prime factor in common with 6: 2, 3, 4, 6. The cototient of 8 is also 4, this time with these integers: 2, 4, 6, 8. There are exactly two numbers, 6 and 8, which have cototient 4. There are fewer numbers which have cototient 2 and cototient 3 (one number in each case), so 4 is a highly cototient number.

Primes

The first few highly cototient numbers which are primes are 

2, 23, 47, 59, 83, 89, 113, 167, 269, 389, 419, 509, 659, 839, 1049, 1259, 1889, 2099, 2309, 2729, 3359, 3989, 4289, 4409, 5879, 6089, 6719, 9029, 9239, ...

See also 
 Highly totient number

References

Integer sequences